The 1963 Bathurst 100 was a motor race which was staged at the Mount Panorama Circuit, Bathurst, New South Wales, Australia on 15 April 1963.
It was organised by the Australian Racing Drivers Club Ltd.
The race was open to Racing Cars, Formula Junior cars and invited Sports Cars and was contested over a distance of 100 miles.

The race was won by Lex Davison driving a Cooper T62.

Results

References

Bathurst 100
Motorsport in Bathurst, New South Wales